Muguet may refer to:

People and fictional characters
 Francis Muguet (1955–2009), a French chemist
 Georges Muguet, a sculptor who served as president of the Société des Artistes Français
 Jeanne Josephine Muguet, wife of Claude Victor-Perrin, Duc de Belluno
 Muguet, a character in the movie How Much Do You Love Me?

Other
 Muguet, the French name for Lily of the valley
 Muguet de Bois, a perfume by Henri Robert
 Prix du Muguet, a French horse race